The IMOCA 60 Class yacht Helvim was designed and built by Philippe Harlé and Alain Mortain the boat was constructed by CDK Technologies and was launched June 1991.

Racing results

References 

1990s sailing yachts
Sailboat types built by CDK Technologies
Sailboat type designs by Philippe Harlé
Sailboat type designs by Alain Mortain
Vendée Globe boats
IMOCA 60